"Chosen Realm" is the 12th episode from the third season of the science fiction television series Star Trek: Enterprise. The series's 64th episode, it first aired on January 14, 2004. Enterprise is taken over by a group of religious zealots called Triannons and Archer must re-take it before it's too late.

Plot

Commander Tucker and Ensign Mayweather are gathering readings on a third sphere in the Delphic Expanse. Enterprise receives a distress call from a Triannon ship which reports they have been damaged by a spatial anomaly. Enterprise takes them aboard, and D'Jamat, the leader of the group, has dinner with Captain Archer where he explains they have been on a year-long pilgrimage to a sphere. They believe deities, called the "Makers," constructed the spheres to transform the expanse, their “Chosen Realm,” into a paradise. D'Jamat then rejects T'Pol's scientific logic that there are only 59 known spheres.

Later, D'Jamat demands Archer turn over control of the ship or it will be destroyed, and demonstrates this by having one of his group self-detonate, killing one crew member. Having little choice, Archer submits. D'Jamat then sets a course for his home world and explains that he intends to use Enterprise to end a religious civil war that has embroiled his planet for a century. D'Jamat also examines the ship's records and finds that Enterprise had extensive contact with the spheres—a severe violation under his faith. He then erases 19 XB of sphere data, and demands that Archer choose one crew member to die.

While Archer is contemplating his decision he approaches Yarrick, D'Jamat's deputy, questioning his resolve, but Yarrick rebuffs him. Archer then tells D'Jamat that he has selected himself to be killed, but requests it be done using a device they use for "waste disposal". That device turns out to be the transporter, which T'Pol uses to beam Archer elsewhere on the ship. Archer then contacts Doctor Phlox and they develop an airborne agent to neutralize the Triannon's organic explosives. Archer again confronts Yarrick and convinces him to help disperse the agent throughout the ship, and learns that the religious war is primarily based around a difference of opinion over whether it took nine or ten days for the Makers to complete their work. Meanwhile, four ships from the "heretic" Triannon faction intercept Enterprise. During the fight, the crew manage to subdue D'Jamat and end the battle. In the brig, D'Jamat remains convinced his actions were justified, so Archer takes him down to their planet. The Triannons are left staring in horror at their completely devastated world, which lies in ruins, having been ravaged by the religious war.

Cast 

 Scott Bakula...Capt. Jonathan Archer
 John Billingsley...Dr. Phlox
 Jolene Blalock...Sub-Cmdr. T'Pol
 Dominic Keating...Lt. Malcolm Reed
 Anthony Montgomery...Ensign Travis Mayweather
 Linda Park...Ensign Hoshi Sato
 Connor Trinneer...Cmdr. Charles 'Trip' Tucker III
 Conor O'Farrell...	Pri'Nam D'Jamat
 Vince Grant...Yarrick
 Lindsey Stoddart...Indava
 Taylor Sheridan...Jareb (as Tayler Sheridan)
 David Youse...Nalbis
 Gregory Wagrowski....Ceris
 Matt Huhn....ND Triannon
 Kim Fitzgerald....Crewman (credit only)

Production 
Guest star Conor O'Farrell who played the religious leader D'Jamat, was previously on Enterprise in the season one episode "Rogue Planet" as a hunter.

Reception 
"Chosen Realm" is noted as a "menacing" plot and notes how there is a threat to Archer and the crew of Enterprise.

Reviewers noted that the episode copies the ending of the TOS episode "Let That Be Your Last Battlefield", with Bureau42 noting the simple switch of "using religion instead of racism".

Herc of Ain't It Cool News gave the episode 2.5 out of 5 and is critical of the episode for being a remake and notes that the episode "ends essentially as "Last Battlefield" did, with the antagonist learning firsthand that fanaticism has decimated his homeworld." He also sees similarities to other episodes: the ponytailed supermen of "Space Seed"; the hippy religious fanatics of "The Way to Eden", and Final Frontier; and echoes of the Bajorans from Deep Space Nine who worship artifacts left by ancient aliens.

IGN gave the episode 7 out of 10, and wrote: "Overall, "Chosen Realm" has more positives than negatives, which puts it on the short of tolerable episodes during the run of Enterprise. This is the kind of episode the series should have been doing three years ago. Had there been this kind of foundation to build upon, maybe the series wouldn't be the train wreck that we're currently enduring."

Jammer discusses how Season 3 has taken on the habit of grabbing action/fighting sequences to drive the climax of episodes. So the absurd taking control of the Enterprise again by aliens provides an opportunity for "the action climax ... to become a predictable punctuation mark".

In 2021, The Digital Fix said that guest actor Conor O'Farrell delivered a strong performance in this episode.

Home media release 
"Chosen Realm" was released as part of the season three DVD box set, released in the United States on September 27, 2005. The Blu-ray release of Enterprise was announced in early 2013, and the season three box set was released on January 7, 2014. The Blu-Ray has a surround sound 5.1 DTS-HD Master Audio track for English, as well as German, French, and Japanese audio tracks in Dolby audio.

See also
 "Starship Mine" (TNG S6E18 (airdate March 29, 1993) Picard must battle terrorists for the Enterprise-D)

References

External links
 

Star Trek: Enterprise (season 3) episodes
2004 American television episodes
Television episodes directed by Roxann Dawson